Bing most often refers to:

 Bing Crosby (1903–1977), American singer
 Microsoft Bing, a web search engine

Bing may also refer to:

Food and drink
 Bing (bread), a Chinese flatbread
 Bing (soft drink), a UK brand
 Bing cherry, a variety of cherry
 Twin Bing or Bing, a candy made by Palmer Candy Company

Names
 Bing (surname), a German-language surname
 Bing (Chinese surname) (邴), a Chinese surname

Places
 Bing Prefecture, an ancient Chinese province
 Bing, Hormozgan, a village in Hormozgan Province, Iran
 Binag, Sistan and Baluchestan, a village in Sistan and Baluchestan Province, Iran
 Manor of Byng, Suffolk, England

Television
Bing (TV series), a British children's television series
Bada Bing or the Bing, a fictional strip club in The Sopranos
 Bing or Evan Chambers, a character in Greek

Other uses
 Bing (company), a German company that manufactured toys and kitchen utensils
 Bing (dog), a British dog who served in World War II
 Bing (mining), a Scottish term for mining waste
 Bing Concert Hall, a building on the Stanford University campus
 Barbershop in Germany or BinG, a German barbershop music organization

People with the name
 Zhao Bing (1272–1279), last Emperor of the Song dynasty
 Bing Devine (1916–2007), American baseball executive
 Bing Futch (born 1966), American musician
 Bing Gordon, video game executive
 Bing Juckes (1926–1990), American ice hockey player
 Bing Miller (1894–1966), American baseball outfielder and coach
 Bing Russell (1926–2013), American actor
 Bing Slamet or Ahmad Syech Albar (1927–1974), Indonesian singer, songwriter, comedian and actor 
 Bing West (born 1940), American military writer and government official

See also
 Bing, Bing, Bing!, a 1995 album by Charlie Hunter
 Bingbing (disambiguation)
 Binge (disambiguation)
 Bing Gordyn, a character in Little Britain USA
 Byng (disambiguation)

Lists of people by nickname